The Boll Weevil Monument in downtown Enterprise, Alabama, United States is a prominent landmark and tribute erected by the citizens of Enterprise in 1919 to show their appreciation to an insect, the boll weevil, for its profound influence on the area's agriculture and economy. Hailing the beetle as a "herald of prosperity," it stands as the world's first monument built to honor an agricultural pest.

The Monument consists of a statue of a woman holding a pedestal with a boll weevil perched on top.

Story 

The boll weevil (Anthonomus grandis), sometimes referred to as the "Mexican cotton boll weevil" was indigenous to Mexico, but appeared in Alabama in 1915. By 1918 farmers were losing whole crops of cotton. H. M. Sessions saw this as an opportunity to convert the area to peanut farming. In 1916 he convinced C. W. Baston, an indebted farmer, to back his venture. The first crop paid off their debts and was bought by farmers seeking to change to peanut farming. Cotton was grown again, but farmers learned to diversify their crops, a practice which brought new money to Coffee County.

Bon Fleming, a local businessman, came up with the idea to build a statue and helped to finance the cost. As a tribute to how something disastrous can be a catalyst for change, and a reminder of how the people of Enterprise adjusted in the face of adversity, the monument was dedicated on December 11, 1919, at the intersection of College and Main Street, the heart of the town's business district.

Description
The monument depicts a female figure in a flowing gown with arms stretched above her head. She raises high a trophy topped by an enlarged-scale boll weevil. The statue stands atop an ornately detailed base which supports two round streetlamps. The base stands in the center of a fountain, which is surrounded by a wrought-iron railing.

At the base of the monument appears the following inscription: 

The original statue of the woman, excluding the fountain and boll weevil, was built in Italy for approximately $1,800. The boll weevil was not added until thirty years later, when Luther Baker thought the Boll Weevil Monument should have a boll weevil on it. He made the boll weevil and mounted it atop the statue.

Vandalism

The boll weevil, and sometimes even the entire monument, has been repeatedly stolen throughout the years. Each time it was found and repaired by the city of Enterprise until July 11, 1998. On that day vandals ripped the boll weevil out of the statue's hands and permanently damaged the statue. City leaders were going to repair the original statue and put it back, but it proved too difficult and costly. A polymer-resin replica was erected in its place in downtown Enterprise in 1998. The original was on display at Enterprise's Depot Museum, a few hundred feet away at 106 Railroad Street. In 2019, following the 100th anniversary of the monument, it was moved to the Pea River Historical and Genealogical Society's Gift Shop. A nearby security camera monitors the monument for further vandalism. In recent memory, dish soap has been poured into the monument fountain resulting in mounds of suds in and around the monument area.

In popular culture 
The monument is featured in the original songs "The Biggest Ball of Twine in Minnesota" by "Weird Al" Yankovic and "Southern Air" from Ray Stevens' album Surely You Joust.

The monument was referenced by Boss Hogg in an episode of The Dukes of Hazzard.

The monument is featured on the artwork of "Voyage Textile", the debut EP of French band "Cocotte". The song "Charançon Armageddon" is a fiction inspired by the story of the monument.

A question about the pest and monument in Alabama was referred to on an episode of the game show, "Cash Cab" which takes place in New York, NY.

The monument was the subject of an episode of the PBS game show, "Where in the World is Carmen Sandiego," with the titular character's goons stealing it and the object for the players being to track it down.

See also
Cactoblastis cactorum, an agricultural pest introduced to Australia to control invasive cactus species, and commemorated with Cactoblastis Memorial Hall in Queensland.

References

Further reading

External links 
More extensive information can be found at Weevil Wonderland.

1919 sculptures
National Register of Historic Places in Coffee County, Alabama
Monuments and memorials in Alabama
Buildings and structures in Coffee County, Alabama
Resin sculptures
Curculioninae
Animal monuments
Monuments and memorials on the National Register of Historic Places in Alabama
Vandalized works of art in Alabama